A Family At War is a British drama series that aired on ITV from 1970 to 1972. It was created by John Finch and made by Granada Television for ITV. The original producer was Richard Doubleday, and with 13 directors during the series. The series examined the lives of the lower middle-class Ashton family of the city of Liverpool and their experiences from 1938 and through the Second World War.

Fifty-two episodes were produced, all but eight of them in colour. Episodes numbers 25 to 32 were recorded in black and white because of the ITV Colour Strike. The memorable theme tune is from the end of the First Movement (Allegro) of Vaughan Williams's Sixth Symphony. The programme opening titles show a scene of a beach with a child's sand castle, with Union Flag flying, slowly being approached by the encroaching tide, symbolic of a beleaguered Britain standing alone in 1940–1941.

Plot summary
The families Ashton, Briggs, and Porter live in Liverpool in 1938 and later. Edwin Ashton, the son of a mineworker, has moved up to the middle class by working for a printing company and by marrying Jean, the sister of company owner Sefton Briggs. The latter is a hard businessman who appoints his son Tony as the new manager of the workplace, rather than the experienced Edwin.

Edwin and Jean have five children: Philip, David, Robert, Margaret, and Freda. Philip is a leftist who fought as a volunteer in the Spanish Civil War. David joins the RAF because he cannot find another job. He is married to Sheila, but he impregnates Peggy. Robert, the youngest son, wants to join the Navy. Margaret, the eldest Ashton daughter, marries John Porter, but she has a troubled relationship with her mother-in-law Celia. All these events take place against the backdrop of the political conflict leading to the Second World War, which will have a major impact on their lives.

Cast
 Colin Douglas as Edwin Ashton
 Shelagh Fraser as Jean Ashton
 Colin Campbell as David Ashton
 Barbara Flynn as Freda Ashton
 Keith Drinkel as Philip Ashton
 David Dixon as Robert Ashton
 Lesley Nunnerley as Margaret Porter
 Coral Atkins as Sheila Ashton
 John McKelvey as Sefton Briggs
 T.R. Bowen as Tony Briggs
 Ian Thompson as John Porter
 Diana Davies as Doris Jackson
 John Nettles as Ian Mackenzie
 Mark Jones as Michael Armstrong
 Margery Mason as Celia Porter
 Patrick Troughton as Harry Porter
 Brett Usher as Ken Beaumont

DVD release
All episodes of A Family at War are available on DVD in the UK, distributed by Acorn Media UK, but with several of the episodes edited from their original running times. For example, in episode three, Margery Mason and Patrick Troughton are credited, but do not appear.

The series was released in the Netherlands in 2015 by Just Entertainment. Several brief scenes cut from the Acorn set  do appear in the Netherlands set, such as the scene referenced above.

The series is rated  PG  in New Zealand for violence, sex scenes and sexual references.

External links
 
 

1970s British drama television series
1970 British television series debuts
1972 British television series endings
British drama television series
ITV television dramas
Television series by ITV Studios
Television shows set in Liverpool
World War II television drama series
Television shows produced by Granada Television
English-language television shows